Alexander Alexandrovich Zgirovsky (born 10 July 2001) is a Belarusian tennis player.

Zgirovsky has a career high ATP singles ranking of No. 1,103 achieved on 21 June 2021. He also has a career high ATP doubles ranking of No. 1,071 achieved on 12 August 2019.

Zgirovsky represented Belarus at the Davis Cup, where he has a W/L record of 0–1.

Future and Challenger finals

Doubles 1 (0–1)

Junior Grand Slam finals

Doubles: 1 (0–1)

Davis Cup

Participations: (0–1)

   indicates the outcome of the Davis Cup match followed by the score, date, place of event, the zonal classification and its phase, and the court surface.

References

External links

2001 births
Living people
Belarusian male tennis players
21st-century Belarusian people